List of rivers flowing in the province of East Nusa Tenggara (Indonesian: Nusa Tenggara Timur), Indonesia. The province comprises the eastern part of the Lesser Sunda Islands. The main islands in the province are, from west to east: Flores, Sumba, Timor, Alor Archipelago, Barat Daya Islands, and Tanimbar Islands.

In alphabetical order

By Island
This list is arranged by island in alphabetical order. The respective tributaries indented under each larger stream's name.

Flores

Sumba

West Timor

See also
 List of rivers of Indonesia
 List of rivers of Lesser Sunda Islands

References

 
Rivers of Lesser Sunda Islands